New Ghaziabad railway station is a small railway station in Ghaziabad district, Uttar Pradesh. Its code is GZN. It serves Ghaziabad city. The station consists of two platforms. The platforms are not well sheltered. It lacks many facilities including water and sanitation. Electrification of the Ghaziabad–Meerut City railway station section was completed in 2012.

Trains 

The following trains run from New Ghaziabad railway station:

 Ambala–Delhi Passenger (unreserved)
 Anand Vihar–Meerut City MEMU
 Bandra Terminus–Dehradun Express
 Delhi–Saharanpur Passenger (unreserved)
 Kalka–Delhi Passenger (unreserved)
 Mandasor–Meerut City Link Express
 Meerut Cantt.–Rewari Passenger (unreserved)
 Nizamuddin–Ambala Passenger (unreserved)
 Old Delhi–Rishikesh Passenger (unreserved)
 Old Delhi–Saharanpur DEMU Passenger
 Rewari–Meerut Cantt. Passenger (unreserved)
 Shalimar Express
 Yoga Express

Gallery

References

Railway stations in Ghaziabad district, India
Delhi railway division
Transport in Ghaziabad, Uttar Pradesh